Until Now may refer to:

Until Now (Ingram Hill album), a 2002 album by Ingram Hill
Until Now (Swedish House Mafia album), a 2012 album by Swedish House Mafia